HD 89307 is a star in the equatorial constellation of Leo. It is too faint to be viewed with the naked eye except under ideal conditions, having an apparent visual magnitude of 7.02. The star is located at a distance of 105 light years from the Sun based on parallax, and is drifting further away with a radial velocity of +23 km/s.

This is an ordinary G-type main-sequence star with a stellar classification of G0V. It is chromospherically inactive and appears older than the Sun with a rotation period of 23.7 days. The star has about the same mass as the Sun and is 8% larger. It is radiating 1.35 times the Sun's luminosity from its photosphere at an effective temperature of 5,950 K.

Planetary system 
In December 2004, using the radial velocity method, it was found to have a long-period giant planet in orbit around it.

See also 
 List of extrasolar planets

References

External links 
 


G-type main-sequence stars
Planetary systems with one confirmed planet
Leo (constellation)
Durchmusterung objects
089307
050473